Kashif Ahmed (born 17 November 1975) is a Pakistani-born cricketer who played for the United Arab Emirates national cricket team.

Kashif Ahmed is a right-handed batsman and a right-arm off-break bowler. He played in 38 first-class and 21 List A matches for various domestic teams in Pakistan between 1995 and 2000, in Quaid-e-Azam Trophy, Pentangular Trophy and PCB Patron's Trophy matches.  He has scored a century in his second first-class match, carrying his bat for Karachi Whites against Rawalpindi A in November 1995, and took four wickets in a List A match once, playing for Pakistan National Shipping Corporation against Pakistan International Airlines in March 2000.

He represented Pakistan at the 1998 Commonwealth Games and in two matches of the Under-19s tour to New Zealand in 1995, but has not played in Test cricket or One Day Internationals for the Pakistani cricket team.

Despite a series of good scores, he could not break into the Pakistan senior team. He soon got an offer to play England league cricket and played for Townville Cricket Club for two years.

In 2005, he played in the ICC Intercontinental Cup for the United Arab Emirates cricket team.

References

1975 births
Living people
Pakistani cricketers
Emirati cricketers
Cricketers at the 1998 Commonwealth Games
Pakistani emigrants to the United Arab Emirates
Pakistani expatriate sportspeople in the United Arab Emirates
Karachi cricketers
Karachi Whites cricketers
Karachi Blues cricketers
Pakistan Customs cricketers
Pakistan National Shipping Corporation cricketers
Cricketers from Karachi
Commonwealth Games competitors for Pakistan